The Bangladesh Livestock Research Institute or BLRI is an autonomous government research institution for livestock and related research.

History
The institute was founded in 1984 in Savar Upazila, Dhaka division, Bangladesh. The executive head is the director general and a 14-member board of management. The chairman is the Minister for Fisheries and Livestock. In 2014, it developed a new species of layer chicken whose sex was discernable at day one of their life. It developed cattle feed from moringa tree and vegetable waste.

References

1984 establishments in Bangladesh
Organisations based in Savar
Agricultural organisations based in Bangladesh
Education in Savar
Livestock
Agriculture research institutes in Bangladesh